Christopher Bowers (born 30 July 1998) is a British slalom canoeist who has competed at the international level since 2014.

He won two medals in the K1 team event at the ICF Canoe Slalom World Championships with a gold in 2018 and a silver in 2022. He also won a bronze medal in the K1 team event at the 2021 European Championships in Ivrea.

World Cup individual podiums

References

External links

Living people
English male canoeists
1998 births
Medalists at the ICF Canoe Slalom World Championships
Sportspeople from Stoke-on-Trent